Thomas "Thom" Fitzgerald (born July 8, 1968) is an American-Canadian film and theatre director, screenwriter, playwright and producer.

Life
Fitzgerald was born and raised in New Rochelle, New York. His parents divorced when he was five years old. He moved with his mother and brother, Timothy Jr., to Bergenfield, New Jersey, where he was raised and graduated from Bergenfield High School. While pursuing his university degree in Manhattan at the Cooper Union for the Advancement of Science and Art, he spent a semester as an exchange student at the Nova Scotia College of Art and Design, and permanently moved to Halifax after completing his studies.

Fitzgerald continues to reside in Nova Scotia. He has described himself as a "struggling Catholic".

Career
In Canada, Fitzgerald worked extensively as a trio with performance artists Renee Penney and Michael Weir for several years as the Charlatan Theatre Collective.

The Hanging Garden

He launched his career in film, releasing his debut feature The Hanging Garden in 1997. It starred Troy Veinotte, Chris Leavins and Kerry Fox. That film won several Genie Awards, including acting awards for Peter MacNeill and Seana McKenna, and a screenplay award for Fitzgerald. It also garnered Fitzgerald the Claude Jutra Award for best feature film by a first-time director, the FIPRESCI European Critics Prize, Best Canadian Film Prize at the Atlantic Film Festival, Best Canadian Film at the Vancouver Film Festival, Best Screenplay at the Mar del Plata Festival, and a number of other awards. The film made its U.S. debut at the Sundance Film Festival.

Beefcake

His second project, which was in progress before The Hanging Garden, was the muscle magazine docu-comedy Beefcake (1999). The story of fitness photographer Bob Mizer (played by Daniel MacIvor) and the wave of fitness magazines in the 1950s, it was commissioned for television by Channel 4 in the UK and Arte in France and Germany. However, the movie was too racy for North American television in 1999, and instead was released theatrically by Strand Releasing. The film debuted at Sundance and garnered four Genie Award nominations. Jonathan Torrens won the Best Supporting Actor Award from ACTRA, the Canadian equivalent of SAG.

Wolf Girl

Wolf Girl (2001) was a Halloween special for the USA Network starring Tim Curry, Victoria Sanchez, Lesley Ann Warren, Darlene Cates, Grace Jones, Shelby Fenner and Shawn Ashmore. Penned by novelist Lori Lansens, the story spins the werewolf genre in reverse, as cosmetic treatments render a furry side-show performer (Sanchez) progressively more psychotic.

The Wild Dogs

The Wild Dogs (2002) is a digitally shot ensemble drama set in contemporary Bucharest. The stories involve a reluctant dogcatcher (Mihai Calota), a diplomat with prostate cancer (David Hayman), and a touring pornographer (played by Thom Fitzgerald). Rachel Blanchard and Alberta Watson co-star. The Wild Dogs debuted at the Toronto Film Festival. Along with three Genie nominations, including Best Supporting Actor for Hayman, The Wild Dogs won the Best Canadian Film Award at the Atlantic Film Festival and the Emerging Master Award at the Seattle International Film Festival.

The Event

The Event (2003), tells the story of Matt, a New Yorker with AIDS (Don McKellar) who has died mysteriously. Parker Posey plays an attorney who takes her investigation personally, pushing his family (Olympia Dukakis, Sarah Polley, Dick Latessa) and friends (Brent Carver, Rejean Cournoyer, Jane Leeves) into stark confessions about the reality of Matt's demise. Thom appeared in the film as Vagimar Director. The low-budget film debuted at Sundance Film Festival, opening to praise. It received numerous awards, including the Siegessäule Reader's Award, the Teddy Award at the Berlin International Film Festival, an ACTRA Supporting Actor Award for Rejean Cournoyer, the Outfest Jury Prize for Best Actress for Dukakis, a Best Supporting Actress Genie nomination for Dukakis, and Atlantic Film Festival Awards for Fitzgerald, writers Tim Marback and Steven Hillyer, and actress Joan Orenstein.

3 Needles

3 Needles (2005) tells three short stories about the global HIV pandemic. In the first, Lucy Liu stars as a blood smuggler who unleashes havoc on a farmer's family. In the second story, a second rate porn actor in Montreal (Shawn Ashmore), hides his HIV status from his mother (Stockard Channing). In the third story, three Christian missionaries (Chloë Sevigny, Olympia Dukakis and Sandra Oh) barter with a South African plantation owner (Ian Roberts) to help a family of orphans. The film has won awards for cinematographer Tom Harting as well as Fitzgerald's direction at the Atlantic Film Festival, and it garnered Fitzgerald a Director's Guild nomination for Best Direction of a Feature Film. The director received promotional support from the United Nations' Global Media AIDS initiative, and the film was released on December 1 (World AIDS Day), 2006, in selected theaters and on Showtime Network.

Cloudburst

In 2010, Fitzgerald's first full-length play Cloudburst debuted in Halifax at Plutonium Playhouse. Critics called the play "a knock-out" and "the best thing to happen to the Halifax theatre scene in a decade" Cloudburst won the 2011 Merritt Award for Best New Play. Fitzgerald shot a film version of Cloudburst in 2011 starring Olympia Dukakis, Brenda Fricker and Ryan Doucette. The film debuted at the 2011 Atlantic Film Festival and won an Atlantic Canada Award for Best Screenplay and the People's Choice Audience Award for Best Film of the Festival. It also won the Audience Award for Best Film at Cinéfest Sudbury International Film Festival, the Audience Award for Best Canadian Indie Film at Edmonton International Film Festival, Top Ten Canadian Film at Vancouver International Film Festival, and Best Film at Image+Nation Montreal Film Festival. It won a Best Canadian Film Award at Victoria Film Festival. It won a Grand Jury Prize at the Atlanta Film Festival. Cloudburst won film festival prizes worldwide, including audience awards in Copenhagen, Barcelona, Hannover, Waterloo and other cities.

Splinters

The 2018 film Splinters, an adaptation of the play by Lee-Anne Poole, premiered at the Toronto International Film Festival.

Stage Mother

Filmography

Quotes

 "Writing and directing is simply about recreating 2,000 little moments from life that you observed."
 "I'm not at a fork in the road. I'm at an eggbeater in the road."
 "I see comedy everywhere. That's how I live day to day. I try to laugh and see the ironies and hopefulness in life, even in the saddest things. They're one and the same in their extremes. If you've ever seen someone truly happy, ecstatically happy, it is indistinguishable from grief."

Awards
 Academy of Television Arts and Sciences, Ribbon of Hope Award, 3 Needles 
 Academy of Canadian Cinema and Television Genie Award (win), Thom Fitzgerald, Best Screenplay, The Hanging Garden 
 Academy of Canadian Cinema and Television Genie Award (nom), T. Fitzgerald, L. Garfield, A. Gelbart, Best Picture, The Hanging Garden 
 Academy of Canadian Cinema and Television Genie Award (nom), Thom Fitzgerald, Best Achievement in Direction, The Hanging Garden 
 Academy of Canadian Cinema and Television Canadian Screen Award (nom), Thom Fitzgerald, Best Writing in a Dramatic Series, Forgive Me
 Academy of Canadian Cinema and Television Canadian Screen Award (nom), Thom Fitzgerald, Best Direction in a Dramatic Series, Sex & Violence
 Athens Outview Film Festival, Jury Award, Thom Fitzgerald, Best Film, Cloudburst
 Atlanta Film Festival Pink Peach Feature Grand Jury Prize, Cloudburst]]
 Atlanta Out on Film Festival Audience Award for Best Overall Feature, Cloudburst 
 Atlanta Out on Film Jury Award for Best Film, Cloudburst
 Atlanta Out on Film Jury Award for Best Actress, Olympia Dukakis
 Atlantic Film Festival, Goldstar Award (win), Thom Fitzgerald, Most Promising Filmmaker, The Movie of the Week
 Atlantic Film Festival, Atlantic Canadian Award (win), Thom Fitzgerald, Best Editing The Movie of the Week
 Atlantic Film Festival, Atlantic Canadian Award (win), Thom Fitzgerald, Best Special Effects, The Movie of the Week
 Atlantic Film Festival, Audience Award (win), Thom Fitzgerald, Best Film, The Hanging Garden 
 Atlantic Film Festival, Canadian Award (win), Thom Fitzgerald, Best Canadian Film, The Hanging Garden 
 Atlantic Film Festival, Atlantic Canadian Award (win), Thom Fitzgerald, Best Direction The Hanging Garden 
 Atlantic Film Festival, Best Atlantic Film Award (win), Thom Fitzgerald, The Hanging Garden 
 Atlantic Film Festival, Atlantic Canadian Award (win), Thom Fitzgerald, Best Direction, The Wild Dogs 
 Atlantic Film Festival, Canadian Award (win), Thom Fitzgerald, Best Canadian Film, The Wild Dogs 
 Atlantic Film Festival, Atlantic Canadian Award (win), Thom Fitzgerald, Best Direction, The Event 
 Atlantic Film Festival, Atlantic Canadian Award (win), Thom Fitzgerald, Best Screenplay, The Event 
 Atlantic Film Festival, Atlantic Canadian Award (win), Thom Fitzgerald, Best Direction, 3 Needles 
 Atlantic Film Festival, Atlantic Canadian Award (win), Thom Fitzgerald, Best Screenplay, Cloudburst 
 Atlantic Film Festival, Audience Award (win), Thom Fitzgerald, Best Film, Cloudburst 
 Atlantic Fringe Festival, Fringe Hit! Award, Charlatan Theatre Collective, Bed and (Maybe) Breakfast
 Atlantic Fringe Festival, Fringe Hit! Hot Ticket Award, Plutonium Playhouse, The Barnacle's Tale
 Atlantic Fringe Festival, Jury Award for Fringiest Fringe Show, Plutonium Playhouse, The Barnacle's Tale
 Barcelona International Gay & Lesbian Film Festival Audience Award for Best Film, Cloudburst 
 Berlin International Film Festival, Reader Jury of the "Siegessäule" Award, Thom Fitzgerald, The Event 
 Birmingham UK Shout Festival Audience Award for Best Film, Thom Fitzgerald, Cloudburst
 Cinéfest Sudbury International Film Festival, Audience Choice Award for Best Film (win), Thom Fitzgerald, Cloudburst
 Claude Jutra Award, Thom Fitzgerald, The Hanging Garden
 CNKY Cincinnati Kentucky BLGT Film Festival Best Feature Film Award, Cloudburst
 Copenhagen MIX Copenhagen Film Festival Audience Award for Best Film, Cloudburst
 Directors Guild of Canada Award (nom, Thom Fitzgerald, Outstanding Direction Feature, 3 Needles
 Edmonton International Film Festival, Audience Choice Award for Best Canadian Film (win), Thom Fitzgerald, Cloudburst
 Golden Trailer Awards (nom), Golden Trailer, Best Independent, The Event
 GLAAD Media Awards (nom), Outstanding Film (Limited Release), The Hanging Garden
 Hannover, Germany Queer Film Festival, Audience Award for Best Film, Cloudburst
 Image+Nation Montreal GLBT Film Festival, Best Feature Film Award, Thom Fitzgerald, Cloudburst
 Indianapolis LGBT Film Festival, Audience Award, Best Overall Film, Thom Fitzgerald, The Event
 Indianapolis LGBT Film Festival, Audience Award for Best Lesbian Film, Thom Fitzgerald, Cloudburst 
 Kingston Reelout Film Festival, Audience Award, Best Narrative Feature, Thom Fitzgerald, Cloudburst
 Mar del Plata Film Festival Best Screenplay, Thom Fitzgerald, The Hanging Garden
 Mix Milano Film Festival Grand Jury Award for Best Film, Thom Fitzgerald, Cloudburst
 New York AIDS Film Festival, Bertha Meka's Award, 3 Needles
 New Zealand Out Takes Film Festival, Audience Award for Best Feature, Thom Fitzgerald, Cloudburst
 North Carolina Gay and Lesbian Film Festival Audience Award for Best Feature, Thom Fitzgerald, Cloudburst
 Philadelphia QFest Audience Award for Best Feature Film, Thom Fitzgerald, Cloudburst
 Portia White Prize Shortlist, 2011
 Portia White Prize, 2012
 Rainbow Reels Film Festival People's Choice Award for Best Feature, Thom Fitzgerald, Cloudburst
 Robert Merritt Award for Best New Play, Thom Fitzgerald, Cloudburst
 Robert Merritt Award (nom) for Outstanding Production, Plutonium Playhouse, Cloudburst
 Robert Merritt Award (nom) for Outstanding Set Design, Thom Fitzgerald, Cloudburst
 Sacramento Gay & Lesbian Film Festival, Audience Award for Best Film, Thom Fitzgerald, Cloudburst
 San Diego FilmOut, Audience Award for Best Feature Film, Thom Fitzgerald, Cloudburst
 San Diego FilmOut, Jury Award for Best Feature Film, Thom Fitzgerald, Cloudburst
 San Diego FilmOut, Jury Award for Best Direction, Thom Fitzgerald, Cloudburst
 San Francisco Frameline Festival Audience Award for Best Film, Thom Fitzgerald, Cloudburst 
 Seattle International Film Festival Emerging Master Showcase Award, The Event and The Wild Dogs 
 Screen Nova Scotia Award nomination for Best TV Series, Thom Fitzgerald, Doug Pettigrew, Forgive Me
 Southwest Gay and Lesbian Film Festival Audience Award for Best Feature, Thom Fitzgerald, Cloudburst 
 St. Louis QFest, Audience Award for Best Film, Thom Fitzgerald, Cloudburst
 Sudbury Cinefest Best Canadian Film Award, Thom Fitzgerald, The Hanging Garden 
 Taos Talking Pictures Film Festival, Taos Land Grant Award (nom), Thom Fitzgerald, The Wild Dogs
 Toronto International Film Festival, People's Choice Award, Thom Fitzgerald, The Hanging Garden 
 Toronto International Film Festival, Best Canadian Feature Film, Thom Fitzgerald, The Hanging Garden 
 Troia International Film Festival, FIPRESCI Prize, Thom Fitzgerald, The Hanging Garden
 Troia International Film Festival, Prize of the City of Grandola, Thom Fitzgerald, The Hanging Garden
 Vancouver International Film Festival, Most Popular Canadian Film, Thom Fitzgerald, The Hanging Garden 
 Vancouver International Film Festival Best Canadian Screenplay, Thom Fitzgerald, The Hanging Garden 
 Vancouver International Film Festival Audience Choice Top Ten Canadian Films, Thom Fitzgerald, Cloudburst
 Verzaubert International Gay & Lesbian Film Festival, Rosebud (nom), Thom Fitzgerald, Beefcake 
 Victoria Film Festival, Best Canadian Film, Thom Fitzgerald, Cloudburst
 Writers Guild of Canada, award nomination, Thom Fitzgerald, Sex & Violence for the episode "Surface Scars"

References

Further reading
 Padva, Gilad. Nostalgic Physique: Displaying Foucauldian Muscles and Celebrating the Male Body in Beefcake. In Padva, Gilad, Queer Nostalgia in Cinema and Pop Culture, pp. 35–57 (Palgrave Macmillan, 2014).

External links

1968 births
Canadian people of American descent
Film directors from Nova Scotia
Canadian male screenwriters
Best Screenplay Genie and Canadian Screen Award winners
Living people
LGBT film directors
Canadian LGBT screenwriters
LGBT Roman Catholics
People from Bergenfield, New Jersey
Writers from New Rochelle, New York
Writers from Halifax, Nova Scotia
Roman Catholic writers
Cooper Union alumni
Best First Feature Genie and Canadian Screen Award winners
Bergenfield High School alumni
Canadian gay writers
20th-century Canadian screenwriters
21st-century Canadian screenwriters
Film directors from New Jersey
Film directors from New York (state)
Canadian artistic directors
Gay screenwriters
Film producers from Nova Scotia
21st-century Canadian LGBT people
20th-century Canadian LGBT people